A by-election was held for the New South Wales Legislative Assembly electorate of Newtown on 3 February 1888 because of the death of Frederick Gibbes.

Dates

Results

Frederick Gibbes died.

See also
Electoral results for the district of Newtown
List of New South Wales state by-elections

References

1888 elections in Australia
New South Wales state by-elections
1880s in New South Wales